M-Net Movies is a group of South Africa-based film-only television channels launched as Movie Magic in 1995 and broadcast across Sub-Saharan Africa on pay TV satellite services DStv and GOtv. The channels broadcast films/movies based on genre as well as clips featuring behind-the-scenes looks at previous, current and future breakout box office hit films.

History
MultiChoice through M-Net launched two M-Net film/movie channels, Movie Magic 1 and Movie Magic 2 a day after the launch of its pay television satellite service DStv. In order to unify/expand the M-Net brand, the channels were renamed respectively M-Net Movies 1 and M-Net Movies 2 in 2005. Two additional film channels, M-Net Stars and M-Net Movies Action (which on launch replaced M-Net Action (then actionX) which launched in 2006), were later launched. In October 2012, the previous film channels were expanded to six channels which grouped films according to genre. These channels, along with the existing Action, Stars and Zone, made for a total of nine movie channels. In June M-Net Movies Action was made an HD channel, followed by M-Net Movies All Stars, both only in Southern Africa, in October 2016.

As of 1 September 2020, M-Net stopped giving their movie channels names and went with the numbering system and reduced the number of movie channels from 6 to 4 channels. M-Net Movies also has an Add Movies feature which allows non-premium subscribers to pay for premium movie channels including future pop-up channels.

Channels
These were the channels they offered before September 2020 and its numbers:
 M-Net Movies Premiere (104)
 M-Net Movies Smile (105)
 M-Net Movies Action+ (106)
 M-Net Movies Action (110)
 M-Net Movies All Stars (111)
 M-Net Movies Zone (139)

A seventh channel M-Net Movies Showcase was later dropped by M-Net on 1 April 2017 with the aim of creating limited run pop-up channels, airing films ranging from those starring Tom Cruise, Sylvester Stallone and Will Smith. On 1 June 2017 it was replaced by Sundance TV. On 1 December 2017, M-Net Movies Zone was made available in HD to all households who owned an HD capable decoder such as the DStv Explora, HD Decoder, HD PVR and were on the all DStv packages. M-Net Movies Zone is the only channel airing on the GOtv service via its Max and Plus packages.

As of 1 September 2020, M-Net Movies stopped giving their movie channels names and reverted to adding numbers to the channels alongside reducing the number of movie channels to four. From now on, there are 4 Movie channels, numbers, qualities and packages.

M-Net Movies 1

M-Net Movies flagship channel consisting of first run movie premieres mostly after being available on the DStv BoxOffice rental service and M-Net, as well as animation specials. The channel is a result of M- Net Movies Premiere and M-Net Movies Smile (Smile being a combination of M-Net Movies Comedy and M-Net Movies Family).

As a combination of M-Net Movies Premiere & M-Net Movies Smile, the channel is only available for DStv Premium as part of the offering M-Net gives after airing a movie on the original channel.

M-Net Movies 2

The premium action movie channel focuses on thrillers and horror movies. It is a combination of M-Net Movies Action and M-Net Movies Action+.

The channel is only available on DStv Premium for its offering from its former home M-Net Movies Action Plus.

M-Net Movies 3

This is a general entertainment channel focusing on the most favoured stars, inherited from its predecessors M-Net Movies Action & M-Net Movies Allstars. Due to most stars being voiceovers, the channel has mostly animated films/movies, with a mix of comedy and romance and some action.

The channel is available for DStv Compact Plus and DStv Compact .

M-Net Movies 4

The lower tiered channel aimed at DStv Access and GOtv Plus subscribers which air all movies shown on M-Net or other M-Net Movies channels.

M-Net Movies Pop-Up Channel

The pop-up channel and the first of the movie channels to broadcast less than 24 hours a day. Initially, the channel was named M-Net Movies Showcase. In 2015, the same year M-Net Movies Smile was formed, another channel, M-Net Movies Romance was incorporated into Showcase, in direct response to viewer complaints of too many repeats. Mostly airing movie festivals such as Star Wars, Harry Potter, James Bond, etc.

This channel is usually available to DStv Premium and this January, the channel wasn't launched for Premium, it was launched for Compact and Compact+. M-Net Movies also has an Add Movies feature that allows non-premium subscribers to watch premium movie channels for a fee which includes future pop-up channels that may launch on M-Net Movies.

References

External links
As of January 2016, all M-Net Movies Channels are under the sub-domain of the M-Net website;
M-Net Movies Action
M-Net Movies Action+
M-Net Movies Premiere
M-Net Movies All Stars
M-Net Movies Smile
M-Net Movies Zone

2012 establishments in South Africa
Afrikaans-language television
English-language television stations in South Africa
Pay television